The reticulated swellshark (Cephaloscyllium fasciatum) is a catshark of the family Scyliorhinidae. The Reticulated swellshark is found in the western Pacific Ocean between latitudes 21° N and 28° S, at depths between 220 and 450 m. It is a blunt snouted shark with an inflatable stomach, narrow eye slits and a pattern of spots and lines covering its body. It can grow up to 80 cm in length.

References

 

Cephaloscyllium
Taxa named by Chan William Lai-Yee
Fish described in 1966